The Integrated Ocean Observing System (IOOS) is an organization of systems that routinely and continuously provides quality controlled data and information on current and future states of the oceans and Great Lakes from the global scale of ocean basins to local scales of coastal ecosystems. It is a multidisciplinary system designed to provide data in forms and at rates required by decision makers to address seven societal goals.

IOOS is developing as a multi-scale system that incorporates two, interdependent components, a global ocean component, called the Global Ocean Observing System, with an emphasis on ocean-basin scale observations and a coastal component that focuses on local to Large Marine Ecosystem (LME) scales.
Large Marine Ecosystems (LMEs) in U.S. coastal waters and IOOS Regional Associations.

Many of IOOS' component regional systems are being dismantled for lack of federal funding, including the Gulf of Maine Ocean Observing System GoMOOS . This has resulted in the loss of long term data sets and information used by Coast Guard search and rescue operations.

Regional associations
The coastal component consists of Regional Coastal Ocean Observing Systems (RCOOSs) nested in a National Backbone of coastal observations. From a coastal perspective, the global ocean component is critical for providing data and information on basin scale forcings (e.g., ENSO events), as well as providing the data and information necessary to run coastal models (such as storm surge models).

Alaska Ocean Observing System (AOOS)
Central California Ocean Observing System (CeNCOOS)
Great Lakes Observing System (GLOS)
Gulf of Maine Ocean Observing System (GoMOOS)
Gulf of Mexico Coastal Ocean Observing System (GCOOS)
Pacific Islands Ocean Observing System (PacIOOS)
Mid-Atlantic Coastal Ocean Observing Regional Association (MACOORA)
Northwest Association of Networked Ocean Observing Systems (NANOOS)
Southern California Coastal Ocean Observing System (SCCOOS)
Southeast Coastal Ocean Observing Regional Association (SECOORA)
Caribbean Integrated Ocean Observing System (CarICOOS)

See also

 GOOS
 Global Earth Observing System of Systems (GEOSS)
 Ocean acoustic tomography
 Argo (oceanography)
 Alliance for Coastal Technologies
 Omnibus Public Land Management Act of 2009 (authorizing legislation for IOOS)

References

External links 
Monterey Accelerated Research System (MARS)
Regional Associations
Coastal Ocean Observing System
Social & Economic Benefits of IOOS from "NOAA Socioeconomics" website initiative
Rutgers University RU27 through the IOOS - Smithsonian Ocean Portal

Oceanography
Earth observation projects
Oceanographic organizations